Nicholas Bayly (born before 1631), was an Irish landowner and Member of Parliament.

Bayly was the son of Lewis Bayly, Bishop of Bangor, and Anne, daughter of Sir Henry Bagenal. He was a member of the Irish House of Commons for Newry between 1661 and 1666 and also served as Governor of the Aran Islands.

Bayly's son Edward was created a Baronet in 1730 and was the great-grandfather of Henry Paget, 1st Marquess of Anglesey, hero of the Battle of Waterloo.

See also
Marquess of Anglesey

References

Nicholas
Irish MPs 1661–1666
Members of the Parliament of Ireland (pre-1801) for County Armagh constituencies